My Damnation is the second studio album by American deathcore band Chelsea Grin. The band entered the studio early 2011 and finished near the middle of the year. The title track was released as a single on April 17, 2011. My Damnation was released on July 19, 2011 through Artery Recordings.

Theme and musical style
The album's lyrics reference Hell and eternal damnation, which are portrayed after death. Musically, the album features many more guitar solos than that of previous releases. Referencing the album, Alternative Press wrote that the band's "Suicide Silence-esque bludgeon" possessed "shades of blackened death metal".

Vocalist, Alex Koehler, stated that the record holds a specific concept in contrast to their previous albums; "I wanted to make the lyrics based more on a story of a man's journey from being a selfish tyrant, to being condemned to hell, seeking forgiveness, and salvation. I wasn't trying to write a religious or spiritual album. I just find the concept of heaven and hell completely fascinating, so it makes it easy to write about."

Reception

My Damnation was met with mixed reviews. The review aggregator site Metacritic gave the album 50/100, based on reviews of 4 critics.

Heany Gregory of AllMusic stated "Smashing together the macabre intensity of death metal with the chugging, technical gymnastics of metalcore, Utah’s Chelsea Grin brutalize listeners with their punishing sophomore effort ... [which] attacks the listener with a relentless deathcore barrage".

Alex Young of Consequence of Sound gave album C−, stating that "My Damnation serves as minor evidence that Chelsea Grin might not become a throwaway copycat. Fans can only hope polish doesn't push these Utah rockers away from their current path and towards the poppier territory of their more famous neighbors."

Track listing

Charts

Personnel

Chelsea Grin
Andrew Carlston – drums 
David Flinn – bass
Jake Harmond – guitar
Dan Jones – guitar
Alex Koehler – lead vocals 
Michael Stafford – lead guitar

Production
Produced, mixed and engineered by Chris «Zeuss» Harris
Artwork by Ryan Johnson
Layout by Mike Milford
Photo by Jeremy Saffer

References

External links

2011 albums
Chelsea Grin albums
Artery Recordings albums
Albums produced by Chris "Zeuss" Harris